Pure Country 2: The Gift is a 2010 American musical Western film directed by Christopher Cain. It follows 1992's Pure Country and stars country music artist Katrina Elam. The filming took place mostly in Nashville, Tennessee, and premiered in the United States on October 15, 2010.

Plot
Bobbie (Katrina Elam) has a naturally beautiful voice and leaves her small town for Nashville, hoping to become a singing superstar. Before she leaves, her Aunt Ella (Jackie Welch) tells her she will succeed beyond her wildest dreams if only she never lies, is always fair, and never breaks a promise. As she prepares to board the bus, Aunt Ella gives her a locket (containing a picture of her mother) and a one-hundred dollar bill.

In Nashville, Bobbie lands a job at a sushi restaurant owned by a man named Morita. Morita believes that anyone who is aspiring to be in the music business will not work hard in his restaurant, so when he asks Bobbie if she is a singer (all his employees are shaking their heads 'no' behind him), she responds "No". Angels in heaven wince and say "that's one", meaning she's broken the first of the three rules that govern her gift.

But it turns out that the other employees are also musicians and have a band called "The Rising Sons". She joins their group, Morita becomes their manager, and they are given an audition by a promoter who is a longtime customer at the sushi restaurant. The promoter convinces Bobbie that The Rising Sons are not talented enough to take her to the top.  Though she repeatedly says, "it's not fair", she eventually gives in and agrees to let them go. The angels in heaven say "that's two", meaning she's broken the second of the rules.

Bobbie grew up not knowing her father and has always wondered about him. When her single climbs the charts and she is interviewed on a television show, the host surprises her by bringing her long-lost father on the show with her. Later, he confesses to Bobbie that he's led a hard life and she'd be better off without him. At that point, she promises to always stand by him, no matter what.

As Bobbie prepares for a live show where she will open for George Strait, her drunken father comes into her dressing room (escorted by security).  After exchanging harsh words, Bobbie tells him she hates him, wishes she'd never met him, and tells him to get out. When he refuses and becomes violent, Strait intervenes and has a physical altercation with him. She has, sadly, broken the third rule - never break a promise. As she heads out on stage, a strong wind blows and takes her voice - her gift - away with it. When Bobbie opens her mouth to sing, only a hoarse noise issues forth, and she runs from the stage.

Bobbie visits expert after expert to try to get her voice back. She is told, more than once, that because of the way her larynx is formed, she should never have been able to sing. Her ability to sing at all was a miracle. The experts all agree that she will never sing again.

Bobbie goes back home to Aunt Ella, and says she's lost her voice. Aunt Ella already knew - each time Bobbie broke one of the three rules, Aunt Ella knew. Bobbie cries because singing is all she's ever done, ever wanted to do. Aunt Ella tells her that when she makes up for the wrongs she did, she'll be able to sing again. She tells Bobbie that her heart is empty, but when it is full, Bobbie will sing from her heart. It won't sound the same as when she sang from the gift, but she will sing.

Shortly after, Aunt Ella passes away. Then, Bobbie sets out to right the wrongs she did. She returns to Nashville, and seeks and receives forgiveness from Morita and the Rising Sons. She arranges a charity performance to support a horse-therapy group. Her father and boyfriend are in the audience. She is called to the stage and says: "I hope you'll forgive the sound of my voice, but I'm singing from my heart. So please just listen to my heart".

Meanwhile, in Heaven, the gift is dancing and twirling around the angels, who have never seen that happen before. Then, a new angel (Aunt Ella) tells them that Bobbie has redeemed herself and the gift should be returned to her. Halfway through the song, the angels send the gift hurtling back to her. Bobbie's voice returns to its former glory.

Cast
 Katrina Elam as Bobbie
 Travis Fimmel as Dale Jordan
 Cheech Marin as Pedro
 Bronson Pinchot as Joseph
 Jackie Welch as Aunt Ella
 Dean Cain as Music Video Director
 William Katt as Winter
 Sharon Thomas as Marilyn Montgomery
 Todd Truley as Keith Haskins
 Michael Yama as Morita
 J.D. Parker as Roy
 Krisinda Cain Schafer as Sis
 Adam Skaggs as Weston
 Heidi Brook Myers as Molly
 George Strait as himself
 Jeff Schafer as Bubba
 Jeremy Childs as Security Guard #1
 Jon Douglas Rainey as Backstage Guest (uncredited)

Soundtrack

The soundtrack for Pure Country 2: The Gift was released by WaterTower Music in 2011, featuring songs from the film by Katrina Elam, including "Dream Big" which was also released as a single in 2010.

Track listing
 "Might as Well Be Me" (Bobby Pinson) – 3:31
 "Love Is" (Pinson) – 3:45
 "Dream Big" (Steve Dorff) – 3:24
 "That's My Man" (Danny Orton) – 3:59
 "Would You Love Me Anyway" (Katrina Elam) – 3:57
 "If Your Love Was a Rock" (Rachel Proctor) – 3:46
 "Love Will Still Be There" (Dorff) – 4:07
 "Second Chance" (Clay Mills) – 3:17
 "Dream Big (Movie version)" (Dorff) – 3:36

Chart performance

References

External links
 
 

2011 albums
2010s musical films
American musical films
Country music films
Films directed by Christopher Cain
Films scored by Steve Dorff
Katrina Elam albums
Warner Bros. films
2010s English-language films
2010s American films